Onyebuchi Chukwu (born 22 April 1962) is a Nigerian politician who served as  Minister of Health from 2010 until 2014.

Early life and education
Chukwu was born in Yaba, Lagos, Nigeria. After attending the Federal Government College, Sokoto, Chukwu trained as a medical doctor at the College of Medicine of the University of Lagos, graduating in 1986. Subsequently, he obtained post-graduate qualification in orthopaedic surgery from the West African Postgraduate Medical College.

Academic career
He is a Fellow of the West African College of Surgeons and a Fellow of the International College of Surgeons. He is an International Affiliate and a member of the American Academy of Orthopaedic Surgeons and a member of the Société Internationale de Chirurgie Orthopédique et de Traumatologie (SICOT).

He was the Chief Medical Director/Chief Executive Officer of the Ebonyi State University Teaching Hospital, Abakaliki (2003–2008). In 2007, he was appointed Professor of Orthopaedic Surgery at the Ebonyi State University, Abakaliki, Nigeria, and visiting Professor of Surgery at the University of Nigeria, Enugu Campus in 2010.

C. O. Onyebuchi Chukwu was the former Nigerian Minister of Health who led the hugely successful fight against the Ebola virus disease outbreak in Nigeria. He is a fellow of both the West African and the International College of Surgeons and a member of the Board of Partnership for Maternal Newborn and Child Health.  Currently, he is the Chairman of the Country Coordinating Mechanism (Nigeria) of the Global Fund to Fight AIDS, Tuberculosis and Malaria (GFATM) and the West and Central African Constituency representative on the Board of the GFATM; as well as the Chairman of the Bureau of Ministers of Health of the African Union (CAMH6).

Political career
Onyebuchi Chukwu was first appointed Minister of Health of the Federal Republic of Nigeria by Goodluck Ebele Jonathan, President of the Federal Republic of Nigeria, in April 2010 and re-appointed in June 2011. As Minister of Health of Nigeria, he championed the Transformation Agenda of the President in the health sector with considerable success. He ensured the approval of the National Strategic Health Development Plan (NSHDP) by the Federal Executive Council and the signing of the International Health Partnership (IHP+) compact securing partners’ commitment to the implementation of the plan. He later resigned in October 2014, to run as a candidate for the Governorship of Ebonyi State, Nigeria

During his term, Guinea worm disease was eradicated in Nigeria, for which the WHO in December 2013 certificated Nigeria as a Guinea Worm Free country.
It was also during his term that Nigeria was declared Ebola-free by WHO Regional Office for Africa after a successful fight against the virus disease outbreak in the country.

Later career
Since 2020, Chukwu has been a member of the Global Leaders Group on Antimicrobial Resistance, co-chaired by Sheikh Hasina and Mia Mottley.

References

1962 births
Living people
University of Lagos alumni
Health ministers of Nigeria
Residents of Lagos